Geraldton Airport  is an airport located  east of Geraldton, Western Australia, in Moonyoonooka along the Geraldton – Mount Magnet Road. On average, from 2013 to 2017, more than 120,000 passengers used the airport annually.

Background 
Geraldton Airport is the general aviation and regular passenger transport airport for the City of Greater Geraldton and it meets varying transport, industrial and commercial interests across the Mid West region.

Geraldton Airport is the main regional base for aircraft charter operations, flight training, private flying, aerial and agricultural work and aircraft maintenance in the Mid West region.

The closest significant aerodromes are Mullewa,  to the east or Kalbarri  to the north and for larger jet operations Perth Airport,  to the south.

Geraldton Airport has daily Regular Public Transport (RPT) services to and from Perth, provided by QantasLink using Fokker 100 and A320 aircraft.

Geraldton Airport is the base for several general aviation flying training and charter operators, namely;
 Geraldton Air Charter, who purchased Abrolhos Air Services in 2002 and incorporated into business.
 Batavia Coast Air Charter
 Shine Aviation Services
 Mid West Aero Club
 OM Helicopters

Shine Aviation Services conduct flying training and utilise a gazetted low flying training area to the south east of the airport. Shine Aviation Services are also a major fly-in fly-out operator in the region.

Midwest Aviation conduct aircraft maintenance and have aircraft engineers.

Bristow Helicopters provide offshore support services to drill companies exploring offshore from Dongara.

The Royal Flying Doctor Service in Western Australia utilises the airport on an as-required basis and has an aircraft hangar which is vested in the City of Greater Geraldton adjacent to the general aviation terminal.

Local charter operations from Geraldton Airport providing fly-in fly-out services include Shine Aviation to Golden Grove Mine, Mount Magnet and Jack Hills. Virgin Australia operates to Boolgeeda Airport from Geraldton, and Network Aviation (branded as QantasLink), National Jet Express and Skippers Aviation operate charters to various sites on a non regular basis. Shine Aviation and Geraldton Air Charter offer fixed wing charters and scenic flights to the Abrolhos Islands.

Geraldton is close enough to Perth to receive a significant number of private operations from aircraft based in Perth. Geraldton is also a convenient location for pilots to fly to for recreational reasons.

Flying training squadrons from RAAF Base Pearce also use Geraldton Airport. They pay regular visits with Pilatus PC-12 training aircraft often staying overnight conducting circuits and cross-country navigation exercises. C130 Hercules transport aircraft also use Geraldton Airport for training on occasions throughout the year.

History 
World War II

From 1941 to 1945, Geraldton was the site of No. 4 Service Flying Training School RAAF during World War II.

It was formed in February 1941 and commenced flying the following month, responsible for intermediate and advanced instruction of pilots under the Empire Air Training Scheme (EATS). The school operated Avro Anson aircraft and by November 1941, two Fairey Battles and two de Havilland Fox Moths also operated at No. 4 SFTS.

In August 1943, No. 4 SFTS had a visit from an Avro Lancaster, "Queenie VI".

Two reserve squadrons were formed in response to the outbreak of war in the Pacific, though they never saw action. Flying activity was reduced towards the end of 1943, and the school was disbanded in May 1945, having graduated over 1,000 pilots. It re-formed as No. 87 Operational Base Unit, which was renamed Care and Maintenance Unit (CMU) Geraldton in May 1946. CMU Geraldton was disbanded in September 1947.

2018-2019 Airport Expansion Project 
In 2019, the City of Greater Geraldton completed a $24 million project to expand the capacity of Geraldton Airport, with works that commenced in November 2018.

The expansion project included the renewal and upgrade of the existing runway, taxiway and apron pavements as well as extension of the main runway to 2,389 metres and expansion of the main apron to accommodate larger aircraft such as the A330 and B787. Geraldton Airport will also have greater capacity as an alternative landing port for Perth Airport in the case of fog or bad weather.

The city also stated that the expansion will enable development of direct interstate and international services for tourism and airfreight, and should give the private sector greater confidence to invest in Geraldton.

The expansion of Geraldton Airport commenced November 2018 and was completed in June 2019, with WBHO Infrastructure being awarded the construction contract.

Funding for the project consisted of:

 $7.5 million contributed by the City of Greater Geraldton
 $6.5 million contributed by the Western Australian State Government
 $10 million contributed by the Australian Government through the Building Better Regions Fund

The airport runway extensions were officially opened on Friday 6 September 2019 by Federal Member for Durack the Hon. Melissa Price MP, City of Greater Geraldton Mayor Shane Van Styn and Member for the Agricultural Region Hon. Laurie Graham MLC.

Airlines and destinations

Statistics 
Geraldton Airport was ranked 45th in Australia for the number of revenue passengers served in financial year 2016–2017.

See also
 List of airports in Western Australia
 Aviation transport in Australia

References

External links 

 Geraldton Airport, official site
 Airservices Aerodromes & Procedure Charts

Airports in Western Australia
Geraldton